Sebastian Maier (born 18 September 1993) is a German professional footballer who plays as an attacking midfielder for Regionalliga Bayern club SpVgg Unterhaching.

Career
Maier started his career with 1860 Munich, where he played during the 2011–12 and 2012–13 seasons.

In early 2013, Maier decided not to extend his contract with 1860 Munich. Thus he was able to join 2. Bundesliga rivals FC St. Pauli on a free transfer for the 2013–14 season. He signed for St. Pauli on a three-year deal until 2016. He finished the 2013–14 season with four goals in 25 appearances for the first team and a goal i ntwo appearances for the reserve team. He finished the 2014–15 season with two goals in 21 appearances. He finished the 2015–16 season with  three goals in 28 appearances.

Maier signed for Hannover 96 for the 2016–17 season, again remaining in the 2. Bundesliga. He finished the 2016–17 season with three goals in 20 appearances. He finished the 2017–18 season with a goal in 12 appearances.

Maier moved to 3. Liga club Türkgücü München in January 2021, having agreed a contract until 2022.

On 12 June 2022, Maier joined Regionalliga Bayern club SpVgg Unterhaching on a one-year deal.

Career statistics

References

External links
 
 

1993 births
Living people
Sportspeople from Landshut
German footballers
Association football midfielders
Germany youth international footballers
TSV 1860 Munich II players
TSV 1860 Munich players
FC St. Pauli players
Hannover 96 players
VfL Bochum players
Türkgücü München players
SpVgg Unterhaching players
Bundesliga players
2. Bundesliga players
3. Liga players
Regionalliga players
Footballers from Bavaria